Sangan-e Sofla may refer to:

Sangan-e Sofla, Qazvin
Sangan-e Sofla, Sistan and Baluchestan